Oberthueria falcigera is a moth in the family Endromidae. It is found in Japan (Hokkaido, Honshu, Shikoku, Kyushu).

The wingspan is 38–46 mm. Adults have a dark ground colour, varying from very dark dusty yellowish grey to smoky brown or greyish brown. The wing pattern is darker and sometimes hardly visible. The submarginal field of the forewings is sometimes suffused with greyish-brown scales. There are orange scales on the hindwings. Adults are on wing from June to late August, probably in two generations per year.

The larvae feed on Acer and Quercus species. They have a peculiar cobra-like thorax and a long anal horn.

References

Moths described in 1878
Oberthueria (moth)
Moths of Japan